Columbus Township is an inactive township in Johnson County, in the U.S. state of Missouri. Township was established in 1870, taking its name from the community of Columbus, Missouri.

References

Townships in Missouri
Townships in Johnson County, Missouri